Headin' for the Rio Grande is a 1936 American Western film directed by Robert North Bradbury and written by Robert Emmett Tansey. The film stars Tex Ritter, Eleanor Stewart, Syd Saylor, Warner Richmond, Charles King, Earl Dwire, Forrest Taylor, William Desmond and Snub Pollard. The film was released on December 20, 1936, by Grand National Films Inc.

Plot

Cast          
Tex Ritter as Tex Saunders
Eleanor Stewart as Laura Hart
Syd Saylor as Chili
Warner Richmond as Ike Travis
Charles King as Tick
Earl Dwire as Rand
Forrest Taylor as Sheriff Ed Saunders
William Desmond as Mr. Mack
Snub Pollard as Cookie
Charles K. French as Pop Hart 
Budd Buster as Senator Black
Bud Osborne as Cactus
Jack C. Smith as Harper

References

External links
 

1936 films
1930s English-language films
American Western (genre) films
1936 Western (genre) films
Grand National Films films
Films directed by Robert N. Bradbury
American black-and-white films
1930s American films